Heckmair is a surname. Notable people with the surname include:

Anderl Heckmair (1906–2005), German mountain climber and guide 
Burgl Heckmair (born 1976), German snowboarder